Dos lagos is a Mexican horror drama television series produced by Televisión Azteca and Fox. Based on the British television series created by David Schulner, entitled Lightfields. The show is produced by Roberto González and Benjamín Salas and written by Adriana Soid. The series premiered on November 9, 2017, and concluded on December 17, 2017.

Cast  
 Matías Novoa as David Laborde
 Cecilia Piñeiro as Marta Ramírez de De la Garza
 Fernando Becerril as Pedro de la Garza Ramírez
 Karla Rico as Viviana Arroyo
 Carlos André as Child Pedro de la Garza Ramírez 
 Fátima Valentina as Child Viviana Arroyo
 Germán Valdés as Young Tomás

References 

Mexican drama television series
Azteca 7 original programming
2017 Mexican television series debuts
2018 Mexican television series endings
Mexican television series based on British television series
Spanish-language television shows